William Henry Peck (December 30, 1830 – February 4, 1892) was a writer from the Southern United States.

Biography
Peck was born in the Sand Hill section of Richmond County, Georgia, part of Augusta.  He was the son of Samuel Hopkins Peck, a merchant in Augusta, and his wife, the former Sarah Holmes Pate. Samuel Peck, later known as Colonel Peck due to his experience in the Mexican–American War, was descended from the Paul Peck family, one of the early settlers of Hartford, Connecticut.

In 1842, Florida's Congress passed the Armed Occupation Act which encouraged citizens to move and settle the relatively untamed areas of central Florida. Peck moved with his father and brothers in 1843 to the Indian River Colony in St. Lucie County in east Florida.  He later wrote descriptively about this area and his meeting with early pioneers such as lighthouse keeper Mills Burnham of Cape Canaveral in the Florida Star newspaper in 1887. In a piece for the New York Ledger, Peck also described the opening of the Indian River inlet with the picks and shovels that were available at that time.  The family is accredited with building the first frame house in the area and Peck's Lake is given to be named for them.  
   
Peck received an extensive education at a boarding school in Connecticut, a military school in Georgetown, Kentucky and attended Harvard where he received a degree in 1853 and masters in 1855.  His writing career took off with submissions to Robert Bonner's New York Ledger where it was reported he was paid $5000 for stories for this publication. In 1873 The Augusta Chronicle reported:

William Peck earlier served as Professor of History at Tulane University of Louisiana and served as an educator for several institutions.  In 1861, he moved to Atlanta, Georgia, where he started The Georgia Weekly and divided his time between Atlanta and New York until he retired to the home of his youth in Jacksonville, Florida. He married Monica Kenny Blake on October 20, 1854, and was the father of seven children. With his family, he later moved to Merritt Island, Florida, where he owned many acres of citrus groves and started a post office. He was postmaster at the Courtenay Post Office which had a steamer called Courtenay. Peck's activities were often written about in the Florida Star newspaper. He later moved from Courtenay to close by Cocoa, Florida. His daughter Byrnnia Peck married Edward Postell Porcher in Charleston, South Carolina, on December 15. Another daughter, Daisy Peck, wrote for the Cocoa Tribune.

Peck died soon after his wife in 1892 in Jacksonville and is buried at Westview Cemetery in Atlanta, Georgia.

Bibliography
Peck published over seventy-five books, mostly novels. These books include:  
 The M'Donalds; or, The ashes of southern homes. A tale of Sherman's march. This book was said to be loosely based on the experiences of his sister's family, the McDonalds from Augusta. (Written at the age of 37)
 The Confederate flag on the ocean. A tale of the cruises of the Sumter and Alabama
 The Stone-Cutter of Lisbon.
 Wild Redburn, an Indian Tale
 In May 1887, he wrote a story in the Florida Star about Gilbert's Bar. A very descriptive account of his teen years about the early pioneers of the Indian River area.
 Story in Florida Star dated July 17, 1889, records a social event at the home of W.H. Peck in Cocoa Florida. "Watching the Night Cereus bloom".
 Published The Fortune-teller of New Orleans. 
 Published Siballa the sorceress; or, The Flower Girl of London. 
 Published The Executioner of Venice, a novel.

Notes

References
 Living Writers of the South, pp 408–412 by James Wood Davidson - 1869 - 619 pages
 Reminiscences of Famous Georgians: Embracing episodes and Incidents, Page 507 by Lucian Lamar Knight - Georgia - 1908 - "Professor William Henry Peck wrote many stories for the weekly press but nothing better than "The Stone Cutter of Lisbon," for which it is said that the New York Ledger paid him five thousand dollars."

External links
 
 Historic Pictures of WH Peck
 

1830 births
1892 deaths
Florida pioneers
Harvard University alumni
Writers from Augusta, Georgia
People from Merritt Island, Florida
American male writers